Žarko Knežević (17 July 1947 – 30 October 2020) was a Montenegrin basketball player who played at the Center position.

Knežević was a member of the Yugoslav national team from 1971 to 1974. He played for Fenerbahçe at the 1978–79 season.

References

External links
 Žarko Knežević at okkbeograd.org.rs
 Žarko Knežević at pobjeda.me

 

1947 births
2020 deaths
Basketball players at the 1972 Summer Olympics
Fenerbahçe men's basketball players
KK Budućnost players
OKK Beograd players
Olympic basketball players of Yugoslavia
Power forwards (basketball)
Montenegrin expatriate basketball people in Germany
Montenegrin expatriate basketball people in Serbia
Montenegrin expatriate basketball people in Turkey
Montenegrin men's basketball players
Serbs of Montenegro
Serbian expatriate basketball people in Germany
Serbian expatriate basketball people in Turkey
Serbian men's basketball players
Yugoslav men's basketball players
1974 FIBA World Championship players